Calcinosis cutis  is a type of calcinosis wherein calcium deposits form in the skin.  A variety of factors can result in this condition.  The most common source is dystrophic calcification, which occurs in soft tissue as a response to injury.  In addition, calcinosis is seen in Limited Cutaneous Systemic Sclerosis, also known as CREST syndrome (the "C" in CREST). In dogs, calcinosis cutis is found in young, large breed dogs and is thought to occur after a traumatic injury.

Causes
Calcinosis may result from a variety of causes such as:
Trauma to the region
Inflammation (bug bites, acne)
Varicose veins
Infections
Tumors (malignant or benign)
Diseases of connective tissue
Hypercalcemia
Hyperphosphatemia

Calcinosis cutis is associated with systemic sclerosis.

Diagnosis

Types 
Calcinosis cutis may be divided into the following types:

 Dystrophic calcinosis cutis
 Metastatic calcinosis cutis
 Iatrogenic calcinosis cutis
 Traumatic calcinosis cutis
 Idiopathic calcinosis cutis
 Idiopathic scrotal calcinosis
 Subepidermal calcified nodule
 Tumoral calcinosis
 Osteoma cutis

Treatment
Intralesional corticosteroids may be beneficial. Colchicine has been shown to be effective in certain populations. The efficacy of other treatments, such as magnesium or aluminum antacids, sodium etidronate, diphosphonates and diltiazem is unclear, but they have been reported to be serviceable in refractory calcinosis. Surgical options may be considered, particularly if there is associated ulceration.

Gallery

See also 
 Calcinosis
 List of cutaneous conditions

References

External links 

Skin conditions resulting from errors in metabolism